The Poland national under-16 football team represents Poland in international football at this age level and is controlled by Polish Football Association.

This team is for Polish players aged 16 or under at the start of a two-year European Under-16 Football Championship campaign.

Achievements

European Under-16 Football Championship
 U-16 European Championship in 1990 – 3rd place
 U-16 European Championship in 1991 – group stage
 U-16 European Championship in 1993 – 1st place
 U-16 European Championship in 1995 – group stage
 U-16 European Championship in 1996 – group stage
 U-16 European Championship in 1997 – group stage
 U-16 European Championship in 1999 – 2nd place

See also
 Poland national football team
 Poland Olympic football team
 Poland national under-21 football team
 Poland national under-20 football team
 Poland national under-19 football team
 Poland national under-18 football team
 Poland national under-17 football team

References

External links
 PZPN under-16 website

U
European national under-16 association football teams